The 39th Yasar Dogu Tournament 2011, was a wrestling event held in Istanbul, Turkey between 11 and 13 February 2011.

This international tournament includes competition includes competition in both men's and women's freestyle wrestling. This ranking tournament was held in honor of the two time Olympic Champion, Yaşar Doğu.

Medal overview

Medal table

Men's freestyle

Women's freestyle

Participating nations

See also
2020 Yasar Dogu Tournament
2019 Yasar Dogu Tournament
2018 Yasar Dogu Tournament
2017 Yasar Dogu Tournament
2016 Yasar Dogu Tournament
2015 Yasar Dogu Tournament
2014 Yasar Dogu Tournament
2013 Yasar Dogu Tournament
2012 Yasar Dogu Tournament

References 

Yasar Dogu 2011
2011 in sport wrestling
Sports competitions in Istanbul
Yaşar Doğu Tournament
International wrestling competitions hosted by Turkey